The 2009 Hualien earthquake occurred  on December 19 at 21:02:14 (local time) with a moment magnitude of 6.4 and a maximum Mercalli intensity of VI (Strong). The oblique-slip event took place off the coast of Hualien, Taiwan. Strong shaking could be felt in Hualien City (Shindo 5 according to Central Weather Bureau) and Taipei (Shindo 4 according to Central Weather Bureau). The earthquake could also be felt in Hong Kong and Xiamen, China, and on several islands between Yonaguni and Tarama, Japan.

Casualties and damage
Two cars were damaged by fallen water towers in Taipei. Ten people were hospitalized following a chlorine leak in a hotel in Hualien. The outer decorative wall of a restaurant in Hualien collapsed. A fire broke out at a warehouse in Taoyuan County, killing a man.

See also
List of earthquakes in 2009
List of earthquakes in Taiwan

References

External links

Earthquakes in Taiwan
Hualien earthquake, 2009
Hualien Earthquake, 2009
2009 disasters in Taiwan